In seven-dimensional geometry, a truncated 7-cube is a convex uniform 7-polytope, being a truncation of the regular 7-cube.

There are 6 truncations for the 7-cube. Vertices of the truncated 7-cube are located as pairs on the edge of the 7-cube. Vertices of the bitruncated 7-cube are located on the square faces of the 7-cube. Vertices of the tritruncated 7-cube are located inside the cubic cells of the 7-cube. The final three truncations are best expressed relative to the 7-orthoplex.

Truncated 7-cube

Alternate names
 Truncated hepteract (Jonathan Bowers)

Coordinates 
Cartesian coordinates for the vertices of a truncated 7-cube, centered at the origin, are all sign and coordinate permutations of
 (1,1+√2,1+√2,1+√2,1+√2,1+√2,1+√2)

Images

Related polytopes 
The truncated 7-cube, is sixth in a sequence of truncated hypercubes:

Bitruncated 7-cube

Alternate names
 Bitruncated hepteract (Jonathan Bowers)

Coordinates 
Cartesian coordinates for the vertices of a bitruncated 7-cube, centered at the origin, are all sign and coordinate permutations of
 (±2,±2,±2,±2,±2,±1,0)

Images

Related polytopes 
The bitruncated 7-cube is fifth in a sequence of bitruncated hypercubes:

Tritruncated 7-cube

Alternate names
 Tritruncated hepteract (Jonathan Bowers)

Coordinates 
Cartesian coordinates for the vertices of a tritruncated 7-cube, centered at the origin, are all sign and coordinate permutations of
 (±2,±2,±2,±2,±1,0,0)

Images

Notes

References
 H.S.M. Coxeter:
 H.S.M. Coxeter, Regular Polytopes, 3rd Edition, Dover New York, 1973
 Kaleidoscopes: Selected Writings of H.S.M. Coxeter, edited by F. Arthur Sherk, Peter McMullen, Anthony C. Thompson, Asia Ivic Weiss, Wiley-Interscience Publication, 1995,  
 (Paper 22) H.S.M. Coxeter, Regular and Semi Regular Polytopes I, [Math. Zeit. 46 (1940) 380-407, MR 2,10]
 (Paper 23) H.S.M. Coxeter, Regular and Semi-Regular Polytopes II, [Math. Zeit. 188 (1985) 559-591]
 (Paper 24) H.S.M. Coxeter, Regular and Semi-Regular Polytopes III, [Math. Zeit. 200 (1988) 3-45]
 Norman Johnson Uniform Polytopes, Manuscript (1991)
 N.W. Johnson: The Theory of Uniform Polytopes and Honeycombs, Ph.D.
  o3o3o3o3o3x4x - taz, o3o3o3o3x3x4o - botaz, o3o3o3x3x3o4o - totaz

External links 
 Polytopes of Various Dimensions
 Multi-dimensional Glossary

7-polytopes